Antonio Ristevski (Macedonian: Антонио Ристевски, born May 19, 1989) is an alpine skier who competed for Macedonia at the 2010 Winter Olympics. He was selected as his nation's flag bearer at the opening ceremony.

References 

1989 births
Living people
Macedonian male alpine skiers
Olympic alpine skiers of North Macedonia
Alpine skiers at the 2010 Winter Olympics
Alpine skiers at the 2014 Winter Olympics
Alpine skiers at the 2018 Winter Olympics
Sportspeople from Skopje